is a railway station in Kita-ku in the northern commercial center of Osaka, Japan. It is the busiest station in western Japan, serving 2,343,727 passengers daily in 2005.

Umeda Station is served by the following railways:

Hankyu Railway (Kōbe Line, Kyōto Line, Takarazuka Line) - Osaka-umeda Station
Hanshin Electric Railway (Main Line) - Osaka Umeda Station
Osaka Metro (Midōsuji Line, Station number: M16)

The freight terminal of Japan Freight Railway Company (JR Freight) (Umeda Freight Branch of Tōkaidō Main Line), closed in 2013, was also called Umeda.

Hanshin Railway

The underground Umeda terminal of Hanshin Electric Railway (officially Osaka-Umeda Station, but commonly called Hanshin Osaka-Umeda Station) is located south of Ōsaka Station, next to underground of Hanshin Department Store. The Hanshin station first opened on December 21, 1906 as a ground level station and moved to the present underground location on March 21, 1939.

Layout
There are five bay platforms and four tracks on the second basement. There are east ticket gates on the second basement and center ticket gates and west ticket gates on the first basement.

Adjacent stations of Hanshin Osaka-Umeda

Hankyu Railway

The Umeda terminal of Hankyu Railway (officially Osaka-umeda Station, but commonly called Hankyu Osaka-umeda Station) is located northeast of Ōsaka Station.

The station first opened on March 10, 1910, as a ground-level station. The original location of the station was southeast of Ōsaka Station and the Hankyu (then Minoo-Arima Electric Tramway) tracks crossed the Tōkaidō Main Line by an overpass. The station was elevated on July 5, 1926.

When Osaka Station was elevated in 1934, Hankyu's elevated tracks were forced to be removed and new Umeda Station was built to handle new ground-level tracks. The switching of tracks were carried out on June 1, 1934. This station facility was used until November 28, 1971, when the move of station to the present location was completed. This move was because of a sharp increase of transit, which forced Hankyu to operate 8-car trains. The existence of JNR tracks on the northern end of the 1934 station prevented the expansion of the station so that the station could not handle long trains.

After the opening of the current huge elevated station, spaces around and beneath the station, as well as the site of former station, were extensively redeveloped. One of the symbols of the commercial complex surrounding the station is the BIG MAN video screen above the Kinokuniya bookshop, common and necessary places to meet in this bustling railway station.

The Hankyu Department Store, built next to the station in 1929, was a pioneer of the successful business model of department stores run by urban railway companies in Japan. The store is still in business at the original location even after the move of the station (as of 2007, the reconstruction of the store building is in progress).

Station numbering was introduced to all Hankyu stations on 21 December 2013 with this station being designated as station number HK-01.

Layout
There are ten bay platforms serving nine tracks on the third floor. There are south ticket gates on the third floor and center ticket gates and on Chayamachi ticket gates on the second floor.

Adjacent stations of Hankyu Osaka-umeda

Osaka Metro

Umeda is the transferring point of three lines of the metro: the Midōsuji Line, the Tanimachi Line and the Yotsubashi Line. Among them, only the Midōsuji Line station is named Umeda, with the station number M16. The Tanimachi Line station is Higashi-Umeda (meaning "East Umeda") and the Yotsubashi Line station is Nishi-Umeda (meaning "West Umeda"). These three stations are connected with each other by underground walkways. Regular tickets of the subway, Surutto Kansai cards and IC cards are valid until the passenger gets out the ticket barrier of the station. The transfer between the three Umeda stations is an exception of this principle; the fare can be calculated as one travel as if the passengers do not exit the station provided the passengers transfer within 30 minutes.

Umeda Station on the Midōsuji Line started its operation on May 20, 1933, as a temporary station. The station was moved to the present location on October 6, 1935. Originally the station with an island platform and two tracks was built amid one tunnel, but on November 5, 1989, the station was expanded to a tunnel that existed next to the station (built for Tanimachi Line but due to change of plan remained unused for decades). The two tunnels are separated by a wall with some passages.

Layout

There is an island platform with two tracks on the second basement. There is a wall with passages in the center of the platform. On the upper level of the platform, there are north, center-north-west, center-north-east, center-south and south ticket gates.

Japan Freight Railway

Umeda Freight Terminal of Japan Freight Railway Company (JR Freight) was a freight terminal on the Umeda Branchline (unofficial name) of the Tōkaidō Main Line owned by West Japan Railway Company (JR West). The station was built to separate freight services from Ōsaka Station and began operation on December 1, 1928. The yard of the terminal was located to the north, literally in the backyard, of the Ōsaka Station.

The freight terminal ceased to handle freight on March 16, 2013 and its function was succeeded by newly established  and other nearby yards. The station was officially closed on March 31, 2013.

The JR West Limited Express trains still use the freight line to transfer from the Osaka Loop Line to the JR Kyoto Line bypassing Ōsaka Station. No passenger trains have stopped at Umeda Station of JR Freight.

Surrounding area

Hankyu Department Store, Hanshin Department Store (Both are owned by Hankyu Hanshin Department Stores, Inc.)
HEP Navio
Hankyu Men's
TOHO Cinemas Umeda
HEP Five
Hankyu San-Bangai
Books Kinokuniya
Hankyu Terminal Building
Hankyu 17 bangai
Hankyu Grand Building
Hankyu 32 bandai
Kitano Hankyu Building
D.D.House
Shin-Hankyu Building
Shin-Hankyu Hachi-Bangai
Hankyu Kappa Yokocho
Hankyu Kosho no Machi
Sonezaki Police Station
Asahiya Shoten
EST
South Gate Building
Daimaru Umeda
Pokémon Center Osaka
Hotel Granvia Osaka
North Gate Building
Lucua
JR Osaka Isetan-Mitsukoshi
Osaka Station City Cinema
ITOCHU
Umeda Center Building
the headquarters of Daikin Industries, Ltd.
the headquarters of NTT Data Sekisui Systems Corporation
Animate Umeda
Yodobashi Umeda (Yodobashi Camera Multimedia Umeda, Comme Ça Store, etc.)
Chayamachi Applause
Umeda Arts Theater
Hotel Hankyu International
NU Chayamachi
Chaska Chayamachi
Maruzen & Junkudo Umeda
Mainichi Broadcasting System, Inc. (MBS)
Umeda Loft
Osaka Marubiru
Umeda DT Tower
E-MA
Diamor Osaka
Whity Umeda
the Hilton Plaza East
Hilton Osaka
Junkudo Umeda
the Hilton Plaza West
Osaka Garden City
the Ritz-Carlton Osaka
Osaka Shiki Theatre
Billboard live Osaka
Shin Umeda City
Umeda Sky Building
the Westin Osaka

See also
 List of railway stations in Japan
 Ōsaka Station
 Namba Station
Transport in Keihanshin

References

External links

Railway stations in Osaka
Osaka Metro stations
Hanshin Main Line
Hankyū Kōbe Main Line
Hankyu Kyoto Main Line
Hankyu Railway Takarazuka Line
Stations of Japan Freight Railway Company
Umeda
Railway stations in Japan opened in 1906